Enzo Reale (born 7 October 1991) is a French professional footballer who plays as a midfielder for Championnat National 2 club GOAL FC.

Club career
Born in Vénissieux, Reale began his career at local side ASM Vénissieux at the age of six before joining the Olympique Lyonnais youth system in 1999.

After developing in the club's youth academy, in 2008, Réale was promoted to the club's reserve team in the Championnat de France Amateur, the fourth division of French football. He spent over two and a half years playing on the team amassing over 60 appearances before making his professional debut on 11 May 2011 in a 4–0 league defeat to Auxerre.

On 4 September 2012, Reale was sold to Lorient for €1 million. He was then sent on loan to Arles-Avignon in January 2015. Reale joined Clermont in August 2015, with a two-year contract.

On 13 June 2022, Reale signed for Championnat National 2 club GOAL FC on a two-year contract.

International career
Reale has represented his country at under-17, under-18, under-19, and under-20 level. He was a part of the team that won the 2010 UEFA European Under-19 Football Championship on home soil.

Personal life
Reale's father, Alain, was born in Algeria to an Italian Pied-Noir family and played amateur football.

References

External links

1991 births
Living people
People from Vénissieux
Association football midfielders
French footballers
France youth international footballers
French sportspeople of Algerian descent
French people of Italian descent
Olympique Lyonnais players
US Boulogne players
FC Lorient players
AC Arlésien players
Clermont Foot players
Lyon La Duchère players
SO Cholet players
AS Béziers (2007) players
CD Manchego Ciudad Real players
GOAL FC players
Ligue 1 players
Ligue 2 players
Championnat National players
Championnat National 2 players
Championnat National 3 players
Tercera Federación players
Sportspeople from Lyon Metropolis
French expatriate footballers
Expatriate footballers in Spain
French expatriate sportspeople in Spain
Footballers from Auvergne-Rhône-Alpes